Strip or Stripping may refer to:

Places 
 Aouzou Strip, a strip of land following the northern border of Chad that had been claimed and occupied by Libya
 Caprivi Strip, narrow strip of land extending from the Okavango Region  of Namibia to the Zambezi River
 Gaza Strip, narrow strip of land along the Mediterranean, in the Middle East
 Las Vegas Strip, section of Las Vegas Boulevard South
 Strip District, Pittsburgh, a neighborhood in Pittsburgh, Pennsylvania
 Sunset Strip, 1.5-mile stretch of Sunset Boulevard in West Hollywood, California, US
 Tarfaya Strip (Cape Juby Strip), a strip of land between Morocco and the Western Sahara along the Atlantic ocean
 Toledo strip, formerly contested area between Ohio and Michigan; see Toledo War

Arts, entertainment, and media

Comics 
 Strip (comics), a comics anthology published by Marvel UK in 1990
 Comic strip, a sequence of drawings arranged in interrelated panels to display brief humor or form a narrative
 Sunday strip, a newspaper comic-strip format

Erotic dancing 
 Striptease, act of removing one's clothes slowly to music
 Strip club, a venue that regularly provides adult entertainment, predominantly in the form of striptease or other erotic or exotic dances
 Stripper, a professional erotic dancer who performs a contemporary form of striptease

Films
 Filmstrip, a form of still image instructional multimedia, once commonly used by educators in primary and secondary schools (K-12)
 Stripping (film), a 2002 Finnish film
 The Strip (1951 film), a 1951 film directed by László Kardos

Music 
 Strip (Adam Ant album), 1983 pop rock album
 Strip (The Chameleons album), 2000 post-punk band album
 "Strip" (Chris Brown song), a 2011 song by Chris Brown
 "The Strip" (Scarlet Pleasure song), 2014

Television
 The Strip (Australian TV series), a 2008 Australian television drama series
 The Strip (New Zealand TV series), 2002–2003 New Zealand television series
 "The Strip" (The O.C.), a 2004 episode of The O.C. television series
 The Strip (U.S. TV series), 1999–2000 American action drama series
 Strip programming, a practice of running a television series at the same time daily

Aviation
 Airstrip, a kind of airport that consists only of a runway with perhaps fueling equipment
 Landing strip or runway, an area for the landing and takeoff of aircraft

Science and technology 
 Strip (Unix), Unix computer command program
 Stripping (chemistry), removal of one or more components from a liquid stream to a vapor stream
 Stripping (fiber), the act of removing the protective polymer coating around optical fiber in preparation for fusion splicing
 Stripping (printing), preparation & assembly of printing negatives in pre-press
 Paint stripper, a solvent that removes paint
 Triangle strip, method for rendering computer graphics
 Vein stripping, a surgical procedure
 Weatherstripping, the process of sealing openings such as doors, windows, and trunks from the elements; also, the sealant materials used

Other uses 
 Strip bond, a financial instrument
 Strip (options), an option trading strategy in finance
 Strip steak, type of beef steak
 Stripping (linguistics), an ellipsis mechanism that elides everything from a clause except one constituent
 Football strip, standard attire worn while playing association football
 Landing strip, or French waxing, a type of bikini waxing

See also 
 Test strip (disambiguation)
 The Strip (disambiguation)
 Stripped (disambiguation)
 Strips (disambiguation)
 
 
 Piece (disambiguation)
 Section (disambiguation)
 Segment (disambiguation)
 Slice (disambiguation)
 Stripe (disambiguation)